Da Baddest Bitch is the debut album by American rapper Trina. It was released on March 21, 2000 through the label Atlantic/Slip-N-Slide Records. The album debuted at number thirty-three on the US Billboard 200 and number eleven on the Top R&B/Hip-Hop Albums chart, and entered the Top R&B/Hip-Hop Catalog Albums in 2002.

Background 
On March 21, 2000, Trina's debut album Da Baddest Bitch was released. The album debuted at number 33 on the US Billboard 200 and number 11 on the Top R&B/Hip-Hop Albums chart.  Da Baddest Bitch was certified Gold in November 2000 by the RIAA. It stayed on the Billboard 200 chart for thirty -nine weeks and on the Hip-Hop/R&B album chart for forty-nine consecutive weeks.

Singles 
The album was preceded by the lead single "Da Baddest Bitch" on December 22, 1999. The single failed to chart on any chart but the Hot R&B/Hip-Hop Songs chart, on which it reached number sixty-four.

The second and final single from the album, "Pull Over", was released on February 13, 2000, and reached number ninety-three on the Hot 100, number forty-six on the Hot R&B/Hip-Hop Songs chart and number forty-one on the Rap Songs chart.

Critical reception

Critical reception 
Craig Seymour of Entertainment Weekly reviewed the album saying, "As nasty as Lil' Kim used to be, Trina boldly positions herself as the new queen of randy hip-hop tales in which sex is a contact sport played by rival genders. Spare Miami-bass beats provide the apt low end for her below-the-belt rhymes on Da Baddest Bitch. And a song about the pain of loving a violent, cash-obsessed thug shows that she's as skilled at speaking truths as she is at hawking fantasies."

Billboard says, "Rap divadom has a new challenger. Trina makes her solo debut with the single, "Da Baddest Bitch," off the album of the same name. The 21-year-old rapper, who made her debut on Trick Daddy's party anthem "Nann," proudly carries the torch lit by female MCs like Lil' Kim and Foxy Brown before her, as an artist not afraid to use her feminine wiles to get what she wants. The Miami bass-influenced track, produced by the Black Mob, has Trina making some serious demands on her men in a slow and steady Florida flow. The hook borrows liberally from Michael Jackson's classic "Bad," as it asks, "Who's bad?" Trina shows that female MCs can boast just like the big boys of rap."

Commercial performance 
The album debuted at number 33 on the US Billboard 200 and number 11 on the Top R&B/Hip-Hop Albums chart. In November 2000, the album was certified gold by the Recording Industry Association of America (RIAA) for selling 700,000 copies in the United States. Da Baddest Bitch stayed on the Billboard 200 chart for 29 weeks and on the Top Hip-Hop/R&B chart for 49 consecutive weeks in the United States.

Track listing

Personnel 
Credits for Da Baddest Bitch adapted from AllMusic.

Robert Alexander – art direction
Derrick Baker – producer
Richard Bates – art direction, photography
Black Mob Group – producer
Hugo Boss – producer
Thomas Bricker – art direction, design
Mike Caren – art direction
Charles Harrison – producer
Solomon "Sox" Hepburn – executive
JV – engineer
Alan Lewis – creative director
Mr. Seay – mixing
Deuce Poppito of 24 Karatz – performer
Red Spyda – producer
Righteous Funk Boogie – engineer, producer
Leland Robinson – producer
Alvin Speights – mixing
Trick Daddy – performer
Trina – liner notes
Dwayne Webb – producer

Charts

Year-end chart

Certifications

References 

2000 debut albums
Trina albums
Atlantic Records albums